Shawn Limpright (born July 6, 1981) is a Canadian retired professional ice hockey player. He most recently played with the Arizona Sundogs of the Central Hockey League (CHL).

Limpright played major junior hockey in the Western Hockey League with the Moose Jaw Warriors.

Awards and honours

References

External links

1981 births
Living people
People from Eastman Region, Manitoba
Ice hockey people from Manitoba
Canadian ice hockey left wingers
Dayton Bombers players
Las Vegas Wranglers players
Rapid City Rush players
Roanoke Express players
Bossier-Shreveport Mudbugs players
Sheffield Steelers players
Esbjerg Energy players
Arizona Sundogs players
Canadian expatriate ice hockey players in England
Canadian expatriate ice hockey players in Denmark